Still Fork is a tributary of the Sandy Creek,  long, in eastern Ohio in the United States. From its source in eastern Carroll County the creek flows northwest through Fox, Washington, Augusta, and Brown Townships before reaching its mouth in Minerva, Ohio. The Ohi-Rail Corporation (OHIC) and Arbor road are situated in the creeks valley over most of its length.

Near Augusta the creek flows through a rural Amish community, and downstream of Ohio State Route 9 is the unincorporated community of Pattersonville.  Mechanicstown and Norristown are the only other named communities in the watershed.

Variant names
According to the Geographic Names Information System, Still Fork has had no other known names.

Still Fork of Sandy Navigation Company

On February 15, 1837, the General Assembly of the state of Ohio enacted AN ACT to incorporate the Still Fork of Sandy Navigation Company. William Croxton’s land was in section 11 of Washington Township, a short distance up Friday Creek from the main branch of Still Fork, and present day county road 71 was the road between Carrollton and Lisbon.

Named tributaries

See also
List of rivers of Ohio

References

Rivers of Ohio
Muskingum River
Rivers of Carroll County, Ohio